Alex Alben (born New York City, 1958), American technology executive, author and law professor, served as the first Chief Privacy Officer of Washington State from April 2015 to May 2019. Previously, he was a candidate for the United States House of Representatives in 2004, a campaign which drew national attention because of the high tech district and the media personalities involved in the race, as noted by media coverage in The New York Times, "In a House Campaign With Personality, One Candidate Has the Microphone," June 12, 2004. He ran as a Democrat in the Eighth Congressional District of Washington. Alben is the author of "Analog Days—How Technology Rewrote Our Future," and consults to public sector organizations, high tech and energy companies on privacy and security related matters.  He is the founder of Get Smart Software, LLC, and a lecturer at the UCLA School of Law, teaching courses on Privacy, Cybersecurity and Internet Law.  Artificial Intelligence, Antitrust and speech regulation on social media platforms are the focus of his current research and writing.

Biography
After graduating Stanford University in 1980, Alben began his career working for CBS News in New York as a research assistant to anchorman Walter Cronkite. He covered the 1980 Presidential campaign and the first Ronald Reagan inauguration. In 1981, Alben worked on the controversial CBS Reports Documentary, "The Uncounted Enemy, A Vietnam Deception," which sparked a $100 Million libel suit between General William C. Westmoreland and CBS News. The suit settled in 1985, with no payment, but a statement from CBS that Westmoreland "had done his duty as he saw fit." By this time, Alben had left CBS for Stanford Law School, where he graduated in 1984. Alben's work at CBS and on "The Uncounted Enemy" documentary are cited in the Sam Adams biography, "Who The Hell Are We Fighting?" C. Michael Haim, Steerforth Press, 2006. Adams's book, "War of Numbers," posthumously published in 1994, was the basis for the documentary.

Alben participated in Stanford University's undergraduate program in Arms Control in 1980 (A.B.) and received a J.D. from Stanford Law School in 1984.  He worked for Senator Claiborne Pell, Democrat of Rhode Island, on the Foreign Relations Committee and Senator John Culver, Democrat of Iowa, on the Armed Services Committee during the Senate's consideration of the SALT II treaty.

Alben began work in 1985 as an entertainment lawyer for the Beverly Hills, CA, firm of Rosenfeld, Meyer & Susman. He moved on to legal and business affairs for Orion Pictures and Warner Bros., before moving to the Seattle area in 1993.

Prior to running for Congress in 2004, Alben served as General Counsel and V.P. Business Affairs for Starwave Corporation and head of government affairs for RealNetworks.  At Starwave, Alben worked on pioneering CD-ROM products and helped launch popular web sites such as ABCNews.com and ESPN.com. As a RealNetworks Vice President, Alben worked on the "RealJukebox" music management project, which contributed to the proliferation of MP3 music files, both legally and illegally disseminated across the Internet.  On behalf of the technology industry, Alben testified before the U.S. Copyright Office, Senate Judiciary Committee and House Commerce Committee on the digital distribution of music and the importance of creating authorized channels for the distribution of Internet Radio and music downloads.  In testimony before the Senate in 2002 as Vice President of public policy for RealNetworks, Alben predicted that web video was evolving so rapidly that one day all television programs would be found on the Internet.

Along with record label and high tech executives, he participated in the founding of the Secure Digital Music Initiative and the Digital Media Association. Alben's work as an entertainment attorney and as counsel for Starwave are explored in the book, "Free Culture," by Lawrence Lessig, Penguin Press, 2004, which describes Starwave's efforts to license digital rights for products such as a CD-ROM based on the film career of Clint Eastwood.

Alben is the author of a comedy-spy novel, Our Man in Mongoa, published by Charles Scribner%27s Sons. Regarding Our Man in Mongoa, Publishers Weekly wrote: "Alben writes smoothly, with terrific pace and even better humor, which, deliciously deadpan, skewers even moving targets."   From 2005 to 2013, he has written opinion pieces about politics and media for The New York Times, Seattle Times and Seattle Post-Intelligencer.  His initial editorial about his experience running for Congress, "Real Candidates Have Curves,"  appeared in The New York Times, Opinion, September 27, 2004. Since 2009, he has written a guest editorial column on media, technology and politics for "The Seattle Times."

Alben's book, "Analog Days-- How Technology Rewrote Our Future" was published in 2012.  Stanford Law Professor Paul Goldstein commented: "In his new book, Alex Alben provides a first-person account of working at two of the pioneer companies that laid the groundwork for the modern web.  His lively narrative covers the creation of ESPN.com and Starwave’s first-of-a-kind web services at a time when we were still rooted in the world of old media." He was selected in 2012 for the speaker roster for Humanities Washington.  Alben's book, "Eliezer's Train and Family Tales- Tales of the Alben and Winokoor Families in the Old and New Worlds," was published in 2022.

He is a graduate of Palisades High School.

2004 Congressional campaign
Alben ran a centrist campaign, according to "September Primary A Necessary Vote," The Seattle Post Intelligencer, August 5, 2004, emphasizing his experience in the high tech world and his active participation in the Digital Millennium Copyright Act and other issues affecting the software industry. Alben won the endorsement of the Seattle Times, the Seattle Post Intelligencer and the King County Journal. The Seattle Times, September 12, 2004, "The Times Endorses . . ."   "In The Northwest: Finding 8th District front-runner is no Dunn deal," By Joel Connelly, The Seattle Post-Intelligencer, August 23, 2004.

During the course of the campaign, Alben publicly criticized radio talk show host Dave Ross, for remaining on his daily radio program, "The Dave Ross" show while actively fund-raising and campaigning as a candidate for federal office. Alben claimed that Ross's activity violated federal campaign finance law, according to the New York Times, in an article published June 12, 2004.

As guest columnist for The Seattle Times and contributor to other publications, Alben writes about issues confronting our culture as a result of new digital devices and applications.  His most recent columns invoke "nomophobia," the fear of losing a cell phone, the "digital afterlife," and the influence of social media on American politics.

Alben is the son of advertising executive, Russ Alben and grand nephew of World War I hero, Bud Alben, for whom Alben Square in Brooklyn is named https://en.wikipedia.org/wiki/Alben_Square

Notes and references 

"Analog Man-- How Technology Rewrote Our Future," The Zeppo Press, 2012.

AI Ethics Journal, Volume 1, Issue 1, Fall 2020.  "When Artificial Intelligence and Big Data Collide," by Alex Alben.

The New York Times, "Real Candidates Have Curves," by Alex Alben, Sept. 27. 2004.

The New York Times, "In A House Race With Personality, One Candidate Holds The Microphone," June 12, 2004

Seattle Post Intelligencer, "In The Northwest: Finding 8th District front-runner is no Dunn deal," by Joel Connelly, August 23, 2004.

The Seattle Times, "The Times Endorses . . ." September 12, 2004.

"Free Culture," by Lawrence Lessig, Penguin Press, 2004.

"Who The Hell Are We Fighting," by C. Michael Haim, Steerforth Press, 2006.

"Our Man In Mongoa," by Alex Alben, Charles Scribner%27s Sons, 1989.

<ref>https://law.ucla.edu/faculty/faculty-profiles/alex-alben<ref>

Living people
1958 births
Washington (state) Democrats
Stanford Law School alumni
American non-fiction writers
Rosenfeld, Meyer & Susman people